Semiconductor Manufacturing International Corporation (SMIC) is a partially state-owned publicly listed Chinese pure-play semiconductor foundry company. It is the largest contract chip maker in mainland China. 

SMIC is headquartered in Shanghai and incorporated in the Cayman Islands. It has wafer fabrication sites throughout mainland China, offices in the United States, Italy, Japan, and Taiwan, and a representative office in Hong Kong.  It provides integrated circuit (IC) manufacturing services from 350 nm to 7 nm process technologies. State-owned civilian and military telecommunications equipment provider Datang Telecom Group as well as the China National Integrated Circuit Industry Investment Fund are major shareholders of SMIC. Notable customers include Huawei, Qualcomm, Broadcom, and Texas Instruments. SMIC is currently expanding by building four 28nm process fabs across China as a result of a joint venture with China’s state semiconductor fund which are expected to come online in 2023 and 2024.

History 

SMIC was founded on April 3, 2000, and is headquartered in Shanghai. It was incorporated in the Cayman Islands as a limited liability company. It quickly built a fully-owned plant in Shanghai, acquired a Motorola plant in Tianjin, and then began to build a fully-owned plant in Beijing. SMIC also became involved in two projects in Chengdu and Wuhan, which reversed a common pattern in Chinese development of government building, operating, then transferring industrial projects, such that SMIC operated the company, but the capital costs were borne by municipal government, relieving SMIC of the major cost of its fab plants. SMIC however, exited the relationship with these two 'Reverse BOT' projects in favor of fully-owned and majority-owned manufacturing sites. In 2013, SMIC established a joint venture in Beijing to fabricate using 40 nm and below technologies.

On December 22, 2014, SilTech Shanghai, one of SMIC's indirectly wholly owned subsidiaries; JCET; and China IC Fund entered into a co-investment agreement to form a consortium regarding the proposed acquisition of STATS ChipPAC, a provider of advanced semiconductor packaging and test services incorporated in Singapore, shares of which were listed on the Singapore Exchange Securities Trading Limited before the acquisition. On June 18, 2015, according to the co-investment agreement, SilTech Shanghai invested US$102 million as a capital contribution for 19.6% ownership interest in Changjiang Xinke, a company incorporated in Jiangsu province, China, which is accounted as an associate of the Group.

On June 23, 2015, Huawei, Qualcomm Global Trading Pte. Ltd., IMEC International, and SMIC announced the formation of the SMIC Advanced Technology Research & Development (Shanghai) Corporation, an equity joint venture company. The joint venture company's focus was to be the R&D for the next generation CMOS logic technology and was designed to build China's most advanced integrated circuit (IC) development R&D platform. SMIC Advanced Technology R&D (Shanghai) Corporation is majority owned by SMIC, while Huawei, IMEC, and Qualcomm are minority shareholders. The focus of the joint venture company is on developing 14 nm logic technology.

On June 24, 2016, SMIC. LFoundry Europe and Marsica entered into a sale and purchase agreement pursuant to which LFoundry Europe and Marsica agreed to sell and SMIC agreed to purchase 70% of the corporate capital of LFoundry S.r.l. for an aggregate cash consideration of EUR49 million subject to adjustment. The acquisition was completed as of July 29, 2016.

On October 14, 2016, Ningbo Semiconductor International Corporation was jointly established by China IC Capital (the wholly owned investment fund of SMIC), Ningbo Senson Electronics Technology Co., Ltd, and Beijing Integrated Circuit Design and Testing Fund with a registered capital of RMB355 million, equal to US$52.8 million. SMIC holds 66.76% of the ownership interest. NSI will develop analog and specialty semiconductor process technology platforms in the areas of high-voltage analog, radio frequency, and optoelectronics. These developments will support customers in IC design and product development for applications in smart home, industrial, and automotive electronics, new generations of radio communications, augmented reality, virtual reality, mixed reality, and other specialty systems.

In 2018, SMIC had gross profits of $747 million and net profits of $149, with $3.6 billion in revenues. It apparently spend around $550 million on research and development, or about 16 percent of sales. On May 18, 2018, ground was broken on the manufacturing base for SMIC in Shaoxing. SMIC was building a plant that would be the first in China to use 14-nanometer production technology. The company said it would increase its investment capacity by 20% in February 2019.

Current co-CEOs are Zhao Haijun and Mong Song Liang. Zixue Zhou serves as chairman of the board. In May 2019, it was said that SMIC's co-chiefs, Zhao Haijun and Liang Mong-song were at odds over how to focus the company.

On May 24, 2019, SMIC announced it would voluntarily delist from the Nasdaq, citing low trade volumes. Along with low US trading volumes, the company named the high administrative cost of maintaining the NYSE listing.; it joined the exchange 14 years before. On May 25, 2019, it announced it would also delist from the New York Stock Exchange (NYSE) following Huawei blacklisting by the United States government.

As of June 2019, SMIC instead became available for over-the-counter trading by American investors via the OTC Markets Group OTCQX Best Market under the stock symbol "SMICY".

In 2019, Qualcomm, Huawei, and IMEC were still minority shareholders in SMIC's R&D arm.

In May 2020, in support of the country's Made in China 2025 program; the China National Integrated Circuit Industry Investment Fund and the Shanghai Integrated Circuit Industry Investment Fund invested a combined US$2 billion, gaining, respectively, 23.08% and 11.54% ownership of SMIC. In July 2020 SMIC issued 1,685,620,000 shares at 27.46 yuan per share on the STAR Market of the Shanghai Stock Exchange, raising 46.28 billion yuan ($6.62 billion).

On July 21, 2022, the company established 7 nm technology. This technology was achieved in two years.

Litigation with TSMC

The company was the target of a lawsuit brought by TSMC, accusing SMIC of misappropriating TSMC intellectual property. The first round of litigation ended in 2005 with a $175 million settlement. A second round was opened in 2006.  The liability phase of the lawsuit began on September 9, 2009, in Oakland, California, and the jury found SMIC liable on 61 out of 65 claims.

SMIC entered into a settlement agreement with TSMC to resolve all pending lawsuits between the parties, including the legal action filed by TSMC in California for which a verdict was returned by the jury against SMIC on November 4, 2009, and the legal action filed by SMIC in Beijing. SMIC and TSMC entered into a settlement agreement on November 9, 2009, to settle and dismiss the California case, including all claims and defenses of SMIC yet to be decided in that case and SMIC's appeal in the Beijing case, thus concluding all pending court litigation between the parties.

Key provisions of the settlement include a mutual release of all claims that were or could have been brought in the pending lawsuits; termination of SMIC's obligation to make remaining payments under the prior settlement agreement between the parties (approximately US$40 million); payment to TSMC of an aggregate of US$200 million; and a grant to TSMC of approximately 8% of SMIC's issued share capital and a warrant which would allow TSMC to obtain total ownership of approximately 10% of SMIC's issued share capital.

U.S. sanctions 

In September 2020, the United States Department of Commerce declared SMIC a military end-user and required that American technology companies dealing with it obtain a license. The action elicited a rebuke from China's Foreign Ministry spokesman Zhao Lijian.

On 4 October 2020, SMIC stated that the U.S. Bureau of Industry and Security had informed some of SMIC's suppliers that according to U.S. export control regulations they must apply for an export license in advance before supplying SMIC with some American equipment, accessories and original products. In December 2020, the United States Department of Defense named SMIC as a company "owned or controlled" by the People's Liberation Army and thereby prohibited any American company or individual from investing in it.

In December 2020, the United States Department of Commerce added SMIC to the Bureau of Industry and Security's Entity List.

Processes

14 nm
On 14 November 2019, SMIC announced that volume production of 14 nm FinFET had begun.

N+1
N+1 is the follow-on to SMIC's 14 nm process, and is targeted for inexpensive chips. Risk production is planned to begin in the fourth quarter of 2020.

SMIC ordered an EUV step-and-scan system from ASML Holding for $120 million in 2018. The order was blocked after the US government lobbied ASML and the government of the Netherlands.

See also
Semiconductor industry
Semiconductor industry in China
List of semiconductor fabrication plants

Further reading

References

External links

Semiconductor companies of China
Foundry semiconductor companies
Companies based in Shanghai
Electronics companies established in 2000
2000 establishments in China
Companies listed on the Hong Kong Stock Exchange
2004 initial public offerings
Chinese brands
Government-owned companies of China
Offshore companies of the Cayman Islands